Worldwide, many nuclear accidents and serious incidents have occurred before and since the Chernobyl disaster in 1986. Two thirds of these mishaps occurred in the US. The French Atomic Energy Commission (CEA) has concluded that technical innovation cannot eliminate the risk of human errors in nuclear plant operation.

Nuclear safety

The nuclear power industry has improved the safety and performance of reactors, and has proposed new safer (but generally untested) reactor designs but there is no guarantee that the reactors will be designed, built and operated correctly. Mistakes do occur and the designers of reactors at Fukushima in Japan did not anticipate that a tsunami generated by an unexpected large earthquake would disable the backup systems that were supposed to stabilize the reactor after the earthquake. According to UBS AG, the Fukushima I nuclear accidents have cast doubt on whether even an advanced economy like Japan can master nuclear safety. Catastrophic scenarios involving terrorist attacks are also conceivable. An interdisciplinary team from MIT has estimated that given the expected growth of nuclear power from 2005 to 2055, at least four serious nuclear accidents would be expected in that period.

Overview
Globally, there have been at least 99 (civilian and military) recorded nuclear power plant accidents from 1952 to 2009 (defined as incidents that either resulted in the loss of human life or more than US$50,000 of property damage, the amount the US federal government uses to define nuclear energy accidents that must be reported), totaling US$20.5 billion in property damages. Property damage costs include destruction of property, emergency response, environmental remediation, evacuation, lost product, fines, and court claims. Because nuclear power plants are large and complex, accidents on site tend to be relatively expensive.

The 1979 Three Mile Island accident in Pennsylvania was caused by a series of failures in secondary systems at the reactor, which allowed radioactive steam to escape and resulted in the partial core meltdown of one of two reactors at the site, making it the most significant accident in U.S. history.<ref>Stencel, Mark. "A Nuclear Nightmare in Pennsylvania", The Washington Post, March 27, 1999. Accessed July 5, 2010.</ref>

The world's worst nuclear accident has been the 1986 Chernobyl disaster in the Soviet Union, one of two accidents that has been rated as a level 7 (the highest) event on the International Nuclear Event Scale. Note that the Chernobyl disaster may have scored an 8 or 9, if the scale continued. The accident occurred at the Chernobyl Nuclear Power Plant after an unsafe systems test led to a series of steam explosions that destroyed reactor number four. The plume spread in the near distance primarily over Belarus and after that covered extensive portions of Europe with traces of radioactivity, leaving reindeer in Northern Europe and sheep in portions of England unfit for human consumption. A  "Zone of alienation" has been formed around the reactor.

At least 57 accidents and severe incidents have occurred since the Chernobyl disaster, and over 56 severe incidents have occurred in the USA. Relatively few accidents have involved fatalities, with roughly 74 casualties being attributed to accidents and half of these were those involved in the Chernobyl nuclear disaster. 

Belgium
 
This list is incomplete but there are no known fatalities in Belgium. See the Laka Foundation's list of recent nuclear and radiological incidents in Belgium from which this table is (partially derived).

Canada

France

Germany

India

Japan

Pakistan

 Russia 

 South Korea 

Serbia

Switzerland

 Sweden 

Taiwan

Ukraine

United Kingdom

United States

See also
Lists of nuclear disasters and radioactive incidents
List of nuclear and radiation fatalities by country

References

External links
The Worst Nuclear Disasters TIME magazineU.S. Nuclear Accidents Compiled by allen lutins''

 
Accidents by country
 
Accidents
Accidents by country